"When the Levee Breaks" is a country blues song written and first recorded by Memphis Minnie and  Kansas Joe McCoy in 1929. The lyrics reflect experiences during the upheaval caused by the Great Mississippi Flood of 1927.

"When the Levee Breaks" was re-worked by English rock group Led Zeppelin as the last song on their untitled fourth album. Singer Robert Plant used many of the original lyrics and the songwriting is credited to Memphis Minnie and the individual members of Led Zeppelin.  Many other artists have performed and recorded versions of the song.

Background and lyrics
When blues musical duo Kansas Joe McCoy and Memphis Minnie wrote "When the Levee Breaks," the Great Mississippi Flood of 1927 was still fresh in people's memories.  The flooding affected 26,000 square miles of the Mississippi Deltahundreds were killed and hundreds of thousands of residents were forced to evacuate.  The event is the subject of several blues songs, the most popular being "Backwater Blues" by Bessie Smith (1927) and "Mississippi Heavy Water Blues" by Barbecue Bob (1928).

Ethel Douglas, Minnie's sister-in-law, recalled that Minnie was living with her family near Walls, Mississippi, when the levee broke in 1927.  The song's lyrics recount the personal toll on a man who lost his home and family.  Despite the tragedy, biographers also see in it a statement of rebirth.

Recording and release
McCoy and Minnie recorded "When the Levee Breaks" during their first session for Columbia Records in New York City on June 18, 1929. The song features McCoy on vocals and rhythm guitar.  Minnie, the more accomplished guitarist of the two, provided the embellishments using a finger picked-style in a Spanish or open G tuning.  Music journalist Charles Shaar Murray identifies Joe McCoy as the actual songwriter.  However, as with all their Columbia releases, regardless of who sang the song, the record labels list the artist as "Kansas Joe and Memphis Minnie".

Columbia issued the song on the then-standard 78 rpm phonograph record, with "That Will Be Alright", another vocal performance by McCoy, on the flip-side in August or June 1929. The record was released before record industry publications, such as Billboard began tracking so-called race records, but it has been called a moderate hit.  "When the Levee Breaks" is included on several Memphis Minnie compilation albums and blues roots albums featuring various artists.

Led Zeppelin version

Led Zeppelin recorded "When the Levee Breaks" for their untitled fourth album.  When considering material for the group to record, singer Robert Plant suggested the Kansas Joe McCoy and Memphis Minnie song. Jimmy Page commented that while Plant's lyrics identified with the original, he developed a new guitar riff that set it apart. However, it is John Bonham's drumming that is usually noted as the defining characteristic of the song.

Recording
Before the released version, Led Zeppelin attempted the song twice.  They recorded an early version of the song in December 1970 at Headley Grange, using the Rolling Stones Mobile Studio. It was later released as "If It Keeps On Raining" on the 2015 reissue of Coda. Prior to relocating to Headley Grange, they tried unsuccessfully to record it at Island Studios at the beginning of the recording sessions for their fourth album.

Page and John Paul Jones based their guitar and bass lines on the original song. However, they did not follow its twelve-bar blues I–IV–V–I structure, but instead used a one-chord or modal approach to give it a droning sound. Plant used many of the lyrics, but took a different melodic approach. He also added a harmonica part; during mixing, a reverse echo effect was created, whereby the echo is heard ahead of the source.

John Bonham's drumming, played on a Ludwig kit, was recorded in the lobby of Headley Grange using two Beyerdynamic M 160 microphones which were hung up a flight of stairs; output from these were passed to a pair of Helios F760 compressor/limiters set aggressively to obtain a breathing effect. A Binson Echorec, a delay effects unit, was also used.

Portions of the song were recorded at a different tempo, then slowed down, explaining the "sludgy" sound, particularly on the harmonica and guitar solos. It was the only song on the album that was mixed at Sunset Sound in Hollywood, California (the rest being remixed in London). Page identifies the panning on the song's ending as one of his favourite mixes "when everything starts moving around except for the voice, which remains stationary". The song was difficult to recreate live and the band played it only a few times, in the early stages of their 1975 U.S. Tour.

Critical reception
Music critic Robert Christgau cited Led Zeppelin's version of "When the Levee Breaks" as their fourth album's greatest achievement. He argued that, because it plays like an authentic blues song and "has the grandeur of a symphonic crescendo", their version both transcends and dignifies "the quasi-parodic overstatement and oddly cerebral mood of" their past blues songs. Mick Wall called it a "hypnotic, blues rock mantra".  AllMusic critic Stephen Thomas Erlewine, in a retrospective review, commented that the song was the only piece on their fourth album on par with "Stairway to Heaven" and called it "an apocalyptic slice of urban blues ... as forceful and frightening as Zeppelin ever got, and its seismic rhythms and layered dynamics illustrate why none of their imitators could ever equal them." In The Rolling Stone Album Guide (2004), Greg Kot wrote that the song showed the band's "hard-rock blues" at their most "momentous".  However, group biographer Keith Shadwick notes the song "suffers from too few ideas added to the ingredients as the minutes tick by, compared with 'Black Dog'" and other songs on the first side of the album.

Other releases
A second version of the song was released in 2014 on the second disc of the remastered two-disc deluxe edition of Led Zeppelin IV. This version, known as "When The Levee Breaks (Alternate UK Mix in Progress)", was recorded on May 19, 1971, at the Rolling Stones Mobile Studio at Headley Grange. This mix runs 7:09, while the original runs 7:08.

Other versions and sampling
Robert Plant performed the song with Alison Krauss on their 2022 tour. One  concert reviewer described Plant's vocal as "astonishing, channeling every flood he had seen in his 74 years into the emotional resonance of his voice".

Bonham's drum beat is one of the most widely sampled in popular music. According to Esquire magazine's Miles Raymer:

See also
List of Led Zeppelin songs written or inspired by others

Notes

References

External links

Songs about floods
1929 songs
Songs written by Memphis Minnie
Blues songs
Columbia Records singles
Led Zeppelin songs
Songs written by Jimmy Page
Songs written by John Paul Jones (musician)
Songs written by John Bonham
Songs written by Robert Plant
Song recordings produced by Jimmy Page
Sampled drum breaks
Works about the Mississippi River